The color structure code (CSC) is a color segmentation method that can operate on multiple processors.

External links

 Introduction to the Color Structure Code and its Implementation by Lutz Priese and Patrick Sturm
 Color Image Segmentation
 Webbased Image Processing, Online application providing live-access to image processing algorithms, including the Color Structure Code (University of Koblenz)
Image processing